HMS Hardy was a V-class destroyer of the Royal Navy that saw service during the Second World War.

History 
Hardy was built by John Brown & Company, Clydebank, laid down on 14 May 1942, launched 18 March 1943, and completed 14 August 1943.

The British destroyers   and  rescued her survivors and sank her. HMS Virago sustained damage to her bow while in contact with Hardy which was later repaired by Russian workers while at the convoy destination in Murmansk.

Notes

References

See also
 Arctic convoys of World War II

External links
 Hardy at naval-history.net
 Hardy at  uboatnet
https://racmp.co.uk/veterans/herbert-sydney-roberts/
https://racmp.co.uk/veterans/frederick-pearce/

 

U and V-class destroyers of the Royal Navy
World War II destroyers of the United Kingdom
1943 ships
Maritime incidents in January 1944
Scuttled vessels of the United Kingdom
World War II shipwrecks in the Arctic Ocean
Ships sunk by German submarines in World War II